This is a list of wars involving Kyrgyz Republic, Kyrgyz and the predecessor states of Kyrgyzstan to the present day. It also includes wars fought outside Kyrgyzstan by the Kyrgyz military.

Legends of results:

Xiongnu Age (201 BC - 89 AD) 
In 209 BC, three years before the founding of Han China, the Xiongnu were brought together in a powerful confederation under a new chanyu, Modu Chanyu. After that, a new age of Xiongnu power began in the Great Steppe. 

In 201 BC, the Xiongnu Empire took over the Kyrgyz tribes. From then until its weakening, the Kyrgyz fought side by side with the Xiongnu in wars against the Han Empire. Then, during the Xiongnu Civil War, the Kyrgyz briefly regained their independence. The Xiongnu's power over the Kyrgyz finally ended after the destruction of the nomadic empire by the Chinese.

Turkic Age (89 AD - 710/711 AD) 
On the ruins of the first nomadic empire emerged the powerful First Turkic Khaganate, marking the beginning of a new era in the Great Steppe.

After gaining independence from the Xiongnu, the Kyrgyz had been developing their statehood, but were overrun by the Rouran Kaganate. The Rourans were then wiped out and the Kyrgyz integrated into the ascendant First Turkic Kaganate. After its fall in 603, the Kyrgyz gained independence and, under the wise leadership of Barsbek Kagan, avoided conquest by the second Turkic Kaganate and proclaimed the establishment of the Kyrgyz Kaganate. The title Kagan meant a claim to the entire Great Steppe and openly challenged the mighty First Turkic Kaganate. in the end, the Turkic Kaganate still captured the Kyrgyz Kaganate and declared themselves the only Great Kaganate in the Steppe.

Age of the Kyrgyz Greatness (744-1207) 
In 744, on the ashes of the Second Turkic Kaganate two great empires emerged: the Kyrgyz and Uyghur Kaghanates. After almost a century of confrontation, the Kyrgyz defeated the Uyghur Kaganate and began rapid expansion across the Great Steppe. Later the Soviet historian Vasily Bartold called this period "The Kyrgyz Greatness".

Mongol Age (1207-1293) 
In 1206, the powerful Mongol Empire appeared in the Great Steppe, which subsequently expanded far beyond the Steppe under the leadership of Genghis Khan.

In 1207, the Kyrgyz voluntarily submitted to the new empire. However, the pressure of the Mongols on them was too great. A series of revolts were staged which were brutally suppressed. Each revolt resulted in the mass extermination of the Kyrgyz by the Mongol army. After the fourth major uprising, Kublai Khan ordered his army to wipe out most of the Kyrgyz and relocate the rest to Mongolia and China. however, upon learning of this, the remaining Kyrgyz fled from Siberia to Central Asia. They had good relations with the Chagatai Khanate's Kaidu Khan, so he took them under his patronage.

Age of the Kara-Kyrgyz Khanate (1842-1855) 
The Khanate of Kokand began to collapse, allowing the Kyrgyz to re-establish their khanate. Meanwhile, the Russian Empire was rapidly taking over the Kazakh tribes, so the Kazakh Khan Kenensary decided to demand support from the Kyrgyz. But, having been refused, he declared war on them, in which he was killed. This allowed the Russian Empire to establish full control over the Kazakh Khanate.

After the triumphant victory over the Kazakhs, the heads of the two largest Kyrgyz tribes began an internal political struggle for power. This escalated into the Civil War in which Ormon Khan, head of the Kyrgyz and head of the Sarybagysh tribe, was assassinated. The Kyrgyz Khanate fell, after which the invasion of the Russian Empire began.

Colonial Age (1855-1916) 
After the Russian conquest of the Kyrgyz tribes, Kyrgyz were integrated into the Russian Empire. Pressure began on the local population, which resulted in regular clashes between the Kyrgyz and the Russian army. With the outbreak of the World War I, the Tsar ordered to call the population of Central Asia to work to the front. Many disagreed and started the revolt, which was brutally suppressed. After that, the Russian Tsar ordered to exterminate the population of the region and use the land for agricultural needs. Hundreds of thousands of Kyrgyz and Kazakhs were exterminated, while the rest fled to China. Ethnic cleansing ended only with the arrival of Soviet power.

Soviet Age (1916-1991) 
With the advent of the Soviet Union,  massive repression, rapid industrialization and the struggle against class inequality began. The Kyrgyz Soviet Socialist Republic was established. In 1941, the Great Patriotic War began, to which every third resident of the Kyrgyz SSR was called up. After the victory, the region continued to actively develop. Infrastructure, education, science and culture were at a higher level than ever.

Kyrgyz Republic (1991-present) 
After the collapse of the Soviet Union, the Kyrgyz Republic gained independence. the country was admitted to the UN and a number of other international organizations. Due to internal political confrontations, Kyrgyzstan has experienced three revolutions, as well as several major border conflicts.

References

 
Kyrgyzstan
Wars